The Manchester Bridge, also known as the North Side Point Bridge, was a steel Pratt truss bridge that spanned the Allegheny River in Pittsburgh, Pennsylvania.

History
The Manchester Bridge became Pittsburgh's second bridge to span from the Point to the North Side.  Its predecessor, the wooden covered Union Bridge, opened in 1874 and was demolished in 1907 after suffering extensive damage from a major flood that same year.  The new bridge was constructed from 1911–1915. and was opened by Mayor Joseph G. Armstrong on August 8, 1915.  It carried motorists across the Allegheny River for the next 54 years.

The bridge closed on October 17, 1969 when its successor, the Fort Duquesne Bridge (located closer to the Roberto Clemente Bridge) opened that same day as part of the city's Renaissance I redevelopment project.  Efforts were made to save the old Manchester Bridge, but it was determined that it had to be removed (along with the adjoining Point Bridge, defunct since 1959 after the opening of the Fort Pitt Bridge) to complete the construction of the new Point State Park.  Explosives were used to drop the south span into the Allegheny River at 18:42 on September 29, 1970. The original attempt 11 hours earlier had been unsuccessful when five of the eight charges failed to detonate. Demolition was subcontracted to Controlled Demolition by Dravo Corporation and was overseen by John D. Loizeaux.  Less than a month later on October 28, the north span was brought down the same way, this time with no problems.

Sculptor Charles Keck designed four figures for the bridge, representing the historical figures of Native American Guyasuta and pioneer Christopher Gist, and the legendary ironworker Joe Magarac and coal miner Jan Volkanik.  These reliefs were removed in 1970 and for a time were displayed on the grounds of the Children's Museum of Pittsburgh. In a move funded by the Pittsburgh Steelers, the reliefs were moved to a display on Pittsburgh's North Shore in July 2016 and are now placed in a location near to their original site.

A structural footing from the bridge still survives on the north bank of the Allegheny River, not far from the south end zone of Acrisure Stadium, and has been cleaned and carved out as the setting for the Fred Rogers Memorial Statue.

See also
 Point Bridge (Pittsburgh)
List of bridges documented by the Historic American Engineering Record in Pennsylvania
List of crossings of the Allegheny River

References

External links

Bridges completed in 1915
Buildings and structures demolished in 1970
Bridges in Pittsburgh
Bridges over the Allegheny River
Demolished bridges in the United States
Road bridges in Pennsylvania
Historic American Engineering Record in Pennsylvania
Steel bridges in the United States
Pratt truss bridges in the United States
1915 establishments in Pennsylvania
1969 disestablishments in Pennsylvania
Buildings and structures demolished by controlled implosion